The mass media in Burkina Faso consists of print media and state-supported radio, news, and television stations, along with several private broadcasters with programs consisting of sports, music, cultural, or religious themes.

Government media influence and control
In Burkina Faso, the authorities have periodically announced their respect for freedom of the media; RadioDiffusion Burkina states that the country's transmission facilities are open to "all political and social sensibilities".  Privately owned newspapers, television, and radio stations are allowed. The Information Code of 1987 provided for freedom of speech and freedom of the press.

However, there are serious exceptions to this freedom. A revised Information Code, implemented in 1993, allows for news outlets to be arbitrarily banned if "accused of endangering national security or distributing false news."  The Conseil Supérieur de la Communication (CSC), the government's Supreme Council on Information, is charged with media oversight. Additionally, non-legal constraints on critics of the government exist.
  
The mission statement of the state-owned Radiodiffusion-Télévision du Burkina (RTB) declares that its broadcast networks are "adapted" to the requirements of law and democratic pluralism. It emphasizes that journalists using public mediums are obliged to "respect the principles of ethics" with regards to "objectivity and balance" in the treatment of information.

Acts against journalists and government critics
In December 1998, journalist Norbert Zongo was murdered by unknown assailants, and his body burned. Since his death, the tragedy has been used by unidentified persons leaving 'warnings' to journalists and broadcast commentators critical of alleged government injustice and/or corruption.

In August 2002, police in Burkina Faso arrested Newton Ahmed Barry, editor-in-chief of the private monthly L'Evénement. Barry was held for two days before being released without charge.

Mathieu N’do, managing editor of the opposition weekly San Finna, was detained by authorities on November 5, 2004, as he was returning from Ivory Coast. His detention may have been linked to his journalistic work, which is often critical of the Burkina Faso government. In particular, N’do has been an outspoken critic of government policy in Ivory Coast where Burkina Faso has been accused of arming the rebellion. N'do was held incommunicado by Burkina Faso's national security service in Ouagadougou until being released without charge on November 11.

Since the death of Norbert Zongo, several protests regarding the Zongo investigation and treatment of journalists have been prevented or dispersed by government police and security forces. In April 2007, popular radio reggae host Karim Sama, whose programs feature songs containing societal criticism interspersed with commentary on alleged government injustice and corruption, received several death threats.  Sama's personal car was later burned outside the private radio station Ouaga FM by unknown vandals.

In response, the Committee to Protect Journalists (CPJ) wrote to the President of the Republic, Blaise Compaoré, to request his government investigate the sending of e-mailed death threats to journalists and radio commentators in Burkina Faso who were critical of the government.  In December 2008, police in Ouagadougou questioned leaders of a protest march that called for a renewed investigation into the unsolved Zongo assassination. Among the marchers was Jean-Claude Meda, the president of the Association of Journalists of Burkina Faso.

Print media
L'Evénement, monthly
L'Hebdomadaire du Burkina, weekly
L'Indépendant, weekly, founded in 1993
Le Journal du Jeudi, satirical weekly  
L'Observateur Paalga, daily with a weekly supplement, founded in 1973, burnt down in 1984, reestablished in 1991  
L'Opinion, weekly
Le Pays, daily, founded in 1991
San Finna, weekly, appearing Mondays, since 1999 
Sidwaya, 1984-, daily

Television

Radio

The government radio corporation Radiodiffusion Nationale runs one radio station in Ouagadougou and another in Bobo-Dioulasso. Broadcasts are in French and 13 indigenous languages, using both medium wave (AM) and FM frequencies. RTB also maintains a worldwide short-wave news broadcast (Radio Nationale Burkina) in the French language from the capital at Ouagadougou using a 100 kW transmitter on 4.815 and 5.030 MHz.

There are also several independent radio stations, as well as foreign radio services such as the Ahmadiyya Islamic Radio of Bobo Dioulasso, BBC and Radio France Internationale (RFI 1 - Afrique) using satellite feeds. As of 2002, there were 3 AM and 17 FM radio stations, including:
On the FM band
17 FMs, including:
RTB
Ouaga FM
Horizon FM
Radio Salankoloto

On the MW band
3 stations

 On the SW band
3 stations (as of 2002)

News agencies
Agence d'Information du Burkina (est. 1964 as L'Agence Voltaïque de Presse) is the government press agency.

See also
 Communications in Burkina Faso
 Cinema of Burkina Faso

References

Bibliography

External links
Links to Burkina Faso's print media are listed at the  BurkinaOnline portal.
 

 
Burkina Faso
Lists of mass media in Burkina Faso
Burkina
Burkina